The 1975 All-Ireland Senior Camogie Championship was the high point of the 1975 season in the sport of camogie. The championship was won by Wexford who defeated Cork by a surprising ten point margin in the final, Cork having defeated reigning champions Kilkenny in the semi-final.

Married Captain
Wexford’s captain Gretta Kehoe got married the day before the final to Ray Quigley who was later to become chairman of Leinster Camogie Council.

Quarter-finals
Una Grace scored three goals for Kilkenny as they overcame Galway in the last quarter of the quarter final at Gowran. Tipperary| led Dublin by 3-2 to 1-1 at half time in the quarter-final but then lost their advantage in the third quarter and had to come back to level. Evelyn Sweeney scored what was to become the winning point. Deirdre Lane’s late free was beaten away by Dublin’s defence and the umpires judged a late free attempt had gone wide, amid some controversy.

Semi-finals
Bridie Doran scored two goals and Eileen O'Gorman a third in Wexford’s 3-4 to 0-2 victory over Dublin in the semi-final. Cork took command after the first ten minutes of their semi-final and dethroned champions Kilkenny, leading by 3-1 to 1-2 at half time with Pat Maloney adding a fourth goal in the second half and by the 14th minute Dublin led 3-5 to 3-2.

Final
Wexford goalkeeper Kathleen Tonks was unsighted by the strong low sun when Mary O'Leary scored Cork’s goal early in the game. Wexford took control at centre field, Bridie Doran scored the first of four Wexford goals in the 23rd minute to leave the scores 1-1 each at half-time, Kit Codd scored Wexford’s second goal in the 9th minute of the second half, this time with the Cork goalkeeper unsighted by the sun, and substitute Mairéad Darcy added two more Wexford goals before the end. Aidan McCarthy wrote in the Irish Times
 Cork played very much like a team meeting the demands called by an away league engagement. Their spirit of adventure was almost non-existent and their forces were deployed with a defensive frame of mind. In those circumstances it was only a matter of time before Wexford would breach the rearguard, and once that had been attained early in the second half, even their defence appeared to give up hope. Unable to gain any degree if parity in midfield, and with their potentially dangerous attackers starved of possession, Cork’s chance died and with it, their resolution, and the match as a spectacle. The fact that Wexford added two further goals was merely of statistical interest, as they were scored against a team which did not appear to have a lot of interest in stopping them.
Agnes Hourigan wrote in the Irish Press: Nor did their ten point margin at the end flatter the victors. Even though they were only on level terms at the interval, the winners though they had been facing a bright sun and a light breeze should by then have been clearly ahead on the play. The big occasion had, in the first half, seemed to affect the accuracy of their finishing both from play and from frees. Faster, fitter, more determined, and in the end physically stronger, the Wexford girls completely dominated proceedings, even though their authority on the field was not reflected on the scoreboard until the closing minutes. Alert goalkeeper, youthful schoolgirl Kathleen Tonks foiled Cork with a couple of wonder saves when Cork sought to rally and then the Wexford mentors played their trump card when they sent in former Enniscorthy Colleges star Mairéad Darcy as substitute for Maggie Hearne. She it was who cracked home two late goals that put the seal on Wexford’s victory.

Aftermath
With Wexford’s victory Gretta Kehoe and Bridget Doyle became the first sisters to captain All-Ireland winning senior teams. Another sister Kit Codd, became the first player to win All-Ireland senior medals with two counties – Dublin (1965 and 1966) and Wexford (1975). Five Kehoe sisters from Clonleigh were to win All-Ireland senior medals Bridget, Kit, Josie, Annie and Gretta. Elsie Walsh later married Brian Cody winner of four All-Ireland senior hurling medals and the most successful manager in Kilkenny hurling history. Bridie Doran was a sister of Mick Jacob, the first Wexford man to win an All-Star, she had married Bill Doran who won an All-Ireland Intermediate hurling medal, brother of All-Ireland hurlers, Tony and Colm.

Final stages

 
MATCH RULES
50 minutes
Replay if scores level
Maximum of 3 substitutions

See also
 All-Ireland Senior Hurling Championship
 Wikipedia List of Camogie players
 National Camogie League
 Camogie All Stars Awards
 Ashbourne Cup

References

External links
 Camogie Association
 All-Ireland Senior Camogie Championship: Roll of Honour
 Camogie on facebook
 Camogie on GAA Oral History Project

All-Ireland Senior Camogie Championship
1975
All-Ireland Senior Camogie Championship
All-Ireland Senior Camogie Championship
All-Ireland Senior Camogie Championship